Antonio Innocenti (23 August 1915 – 6 September 2008) was an Italian cardinal who was a leading figure in the Roman Curia and the Vatican diplomatic service for many years.

Biography

He was born at Poppi, Italy. Ordained in 1938 at Florence, Innocenti was studied at the Episcopal Seminary of Fiesole, the Pontifical Gregorian University where he received a doctorate in 1941, the Pontifical Lateran University, where he received a licentiate in dogmatic theology in 1950, and the Pontifical Ecclesiastical Academy, where he studied diplomacy. He served as a priest in northern Italy for the decade following his ordination. His work helping Jews led to his arrest and almost being shot by a firing squad; he was released at the last minute. He was then called to Rome by Pope Pius XII and settled on a career in the Curia. He served for most of the 1950s and 1960s in the Papal Nunciature in Switzerland, where, as he saw it, the major problems were "an opulent society, religious assistance to immigrants and relations with Christian of other denominations".

On 15 December 1967, Pope Paul VI named him Titular Archbishop of Eclano and Apostolic Nuncio to Paraguay. He was appointed Secretary of the Congregation for the Discipline of the Sacraments (now the Congregation for Divine Worship) until 1980, when he became Nuncio to Spain.

In 1985, Pope John Paul II made him a cardinal, and on 9 January 1986 appointed him Prefect of the Congregation for the Clergy, a post he held until his retirement in 1991. During Innocenti's time as Prefect, the Curia was extremely busy dealing with what was perceived as dangerous dissent from papal teaching, and Innocenti was heavily involved with many lay movements designed to restore orthodoxy among the Church's members.

By 1999 he had retired to Piazza della Citta Leonina.

References

External links
 Biography

|-

20th-century Italian cardinals
1915 births
2008 deaths
Pontifical Ecclesiastical Academy alumni
Pontifical Gregorian University alumni
Pontifical Lateran University alumni
Prefects of the Congregation for the Clergy
Pontifical Commission for the Cultural Heritage of the Church
Pontifical Commission Ecclesia Dei
Cardinals created by Pope John Paul II